Shalom Peterburg (born 4 March 1941) is an Israeli footballer. He played in four matches for the Israel national football team in 1961.

References

External links
 

1941 births
Living people
Israeli footballers
Israel international footballers
Place of birth missing (living people)
Association footballers not categorized by position